Anna Vitalyevna Barsukova  (born 7 October 1981) "(maiden name — Sidorenko)" is a Russian film director, screenwriter, camerawoman and musician. She is a member of the Russian Union of Cinematographers (since 2019), the International Society for Women in Film & Television in Vancouver (WIFTV), and the Guild of Documentary Films and Television.
She authored and directed documentaries You Are Not Alone!, and Voice for the Voiceless about the social stereotypes and discrimination against PLHIV(music composer: Guli Kambarova)

Biography 
Born on 7 October 1981 in the city of Nikopol, Dnepropetrovsk region, Ukrainian SSR, Anna Barsukova was active in sports and music since early childhood. She competed for prizes in rhythmic gymnastics contests and won first prizes in regional violin competitions. In 2006, after completing her studies at the Academy of Music as a violinist and symphony orchestra conductor, Anna earned a higher education degree in music from the Rostov State Rachmaninoff Conservatory in Russia. As a musician she collaborated with many accomplished composers and musicians of our times including Yuri Bashmet, Sergey Yakovenko, Gyuli Kambarova, Oleg Bezuglov and Giya Kancheli. In 2016, Anna received a secondary education and became a film director. She graduated with honors.

Filmography 
 2016 Broken Path, short feature film
 2017 You Are Not Alone, documentary short film
 2019 Voice for the Voiceless documentary short film

Awards  
 2019 Voice for the Voiceless
(selectively)

* 2017 You Are Not Alone
(selectively)

* 2016 Broken Path

Media publications 
(selectively)

 Moscow Director Anna Barsukova presented a film about HIV in Khanty-Mansiysk
 Ugra TV channel about the film Voice for the Voiceless
 Screening of the film "Voice for the Voiceless" in the framework of the festival "Spirit of fire" – TV Ugra report
 THE ZNAMYA CINEMA WILL SHOW THE SOCIALLY SIGNIFICANT FILM "VOICE FOR THE VOICELESS"
 The Rostov house of cinema hosted the premiere screening of the documentary "You Are Not Alone!"
 Rostov-on-don. Premiere of the documentary "You Are Not Alone!"
 Anna Barsukova: "No one wanted to reveal their secret"
 I have HIV: how the story of a girl with a" shameful " diagnosis became the script of a documentary
 The Odyssey Foundation supported the Serbs and the Director of Voice for the Voiceless
 Actress Olga Budina told "Around TV" about her participation in the film "Voice for the Voiceless" — dir. Anna Barsukova
 Why making a film about HIV in Yekaterinburg turned out to be a problem
 Premiere on RUSTALK TV — Voice for the Voiceless
 Director Anna Barsukova will come to Khanty-Mansiysk with her film

References 

Russian film directors
Russian screenwriters
1981 births
Living people